Warut Boonsuk (born August 23, 1997), simply known as Rut, is a Thai professional footballer who plays as a left winger for Thai League 2 club Customs Ladkrabang United.

References

External links

fourfourtwo.com 

1997 births
Living people
Warut Boonsuk
Warut Boonsuk
Association football goalkeepers
Warut Boonsuk
Warut Boonsuk